The Irish World refers to two newspapers:
The Irish World, a late-nineteenth-century paper in New York owned by Patrick Ford (journalist)
The Irish World (London), 1987–present